Illyria: Spotlight is a comic, a story based on the Angel television series. This title, along with the others in IDW Publishing's Spotlight series, was collected in the Angel: Spotlight trade paperback.

Story description

Summary
Illyria, an Old One who has only recently been reintroduced to its life, tries to further understand humanity by studying the vessel whom it now occupies, Fred. Illyria considers whether she is capable of guilt.

Expanded overview

A woman named Mrs. Balducci addresses the court in a Los Angeles courtroom. She asks for leniency for Alex Rich, the man who killed her son and three other people in a convenience store. The incredulous judge asks her why, because the defendant shows no remorse for his crime. A young woman stands up in the courtroom and asks if remorse would make a difference when someone was guilty of terrible things. The judge orders the woman to sit down, but Mrs. Balducci agrees with her. She says that rather than see Rich put to death, she wants him to be forced to live out his life in prison, endlessly watching videos of his victims' lives. She approaches Rich as she says this, and he leans forward and bites off the end of her finger. The judge immediately clears the courtroom and reschedules the sentencing, as Rich is dragged away.

Rich is antagonizing the guards in a prison transport when the vehicle is forced to stop on a desert road. The woman from the courtroom is standing in the road. Before their eyes, her clothes and appearance change to reveal her true self: Illyria. She hits the truck, knocking it onto its side. Deflecting the guards' bullets, she takes Rich, leaving the guards alive.

In a flashback at Wolfram & Hart, Illyria has somehow implied that Wesley would be interested in a relationship with her. Wesley calls her a monster, and she threatens him, saying, "I could break you in half, right now, and not shed a tear. Yet I don't. How does that make me a monster?" Wesley replies, "it doesn't. But the fact that you could do it and not shed a tear does." Wesley says that remorseless killing is inhuman. Illyria points out that Wesley killed Knox and shed no tears, and asks if that was a monstrous act. Wesley says it was, "but at least I recognize it." He states that he willingly gave up a piece of his humanity because Knox was no innocent - he killed Fred, the woman Wesley loved. Illyria asks if she would be more human than Wesley if she felt remorse for her role in what happened to Fred, and Wesley simply replies that she can't.

As they walk through the desert night, Illyria asks Rich why he feels no remorse for his actions. She wonders what it is that makes Rich human, and Illyria not. Rich points out that he was born human, when Illyria clearly was not. Suddenly, they are spotted by a police helicopter. Illyria leaps up to the helicopter, tosses the police officer inside to the ground, and orders Rich to climb aboard. She tells the pilot that he will live if he does as she says. Having been dropped off atop a desert butte, Illyria asks Rich why the judge wanted him to feel remorse. Rich replies, "he wanted to drag me down. Make me weak, like him." He says that he sees his victims as "livestock." He asks, "does a farmer feel remorse when he beheads some chickens?" Illyria says that he dehumanizes them; he thinks as them as animals, or vessels. She examines her own once-human body. Illyria then tells Rich that one of his four victims was a demon whose clan wanted justice. They had hired Wolfram and Hart to deliver Rich to them, which Illyria has just done. "And if you think of your fellow humans as animals, well," she says, "just imagine how the demons think of you."

In Texas, Roger Burkle arrives home to a surprise: his wife Trish tells him that their daughter, Winifred, has come home. She says that Fred has been upstairs for days, watching the family's old home movies of Fred over and over. As she watches the former life of her vessel, Illyria begins to cry.

At Wolfram and Hart, Wesley tells Illyria that their clients are pleased with the way she handled Rich's case. She tells Wesley that she did the job for him, to learn about remorse. Wesley asks if she found a way to feel regret for Fred; after a pause, Illyria says she didn't and walks away.

Character development
According to this comic, Illyria appears to be capable of human emotions on at least some level, but can never demonstrate it because of a sense of pride typical of someone of royal stature.

Writing and artwork
 Peter David's wife Kathleen revealed her contribution to the story on David's official web site:

 The subtitle for Russell Walks' cover reads:

I WILL FIGHT. 
I WILL RETURN IN KIND EVERY BLOW. EVERY STING
I WILL SHRED MY ADVERSARIES

Continuity
 This story is set during Angel season 5, between "Underneath" and "Power Play".

Canonical issues

Angel comics such as this one are not usually considered by fans as canonical. Some fans consider them stories from the imaginations of authors and artists, while other fans consider them as taking place in an alternative fictional reality. However unlike fan fiction, overviews summarising their story, written early in the writing process, were 'approved' by both Fox and Joss Whedon (or his office), and the books were therefore later published as officially Buffy merchandise.

External links

Reviews
 Dodsworth, James, "Angel Spotlight: Illyria" FractalMatter.com (April 2006).
 White, Adam, "Angel Spotlight: Illyria #1" ComicCritique.com (22 May 2006).
 Scott, Cavan, "Review: Angel Spotlight: Illyria #1" HorrorComics.wordpress.com (3 June 2006).

References

Angel (1999 TV series) comics
One-shot comic titles